Omm ol Khareyn (also known as Hovīsār, Omm-ol Hazīn, and Omm ol Khazeyn) is a village in Gharb-e Karun Rural District, in the Central District of Khorramshahr County, Khuzestan Province, Iran. At the 2006 census, its population was 399, in 71 families.

References 

Populated places in Khorramshahr County